Messenian Wars refers to the wars between Messenia and Sparta in the 8th and 7th centuries BC as well as the 4th century BC.

First Messenian War
Second Messenian War
Third Messenian War